Cristina Morales Martin (born 27 July 1993) is a Spanish kickboxer. She is the reigning ISKA Atomweight K1 World Champion, and the former Enfusion 52 kg World Champion.

Kickboxing career
In March 2019, Morales was scheduled to fight Fanny Ramos for the ISKA Atomweight belt. Morales won by a third round high kick knockout. She became the first Spanish ISKA champion.

During Enfusion Ece 1, she faced Emilie Machut. Morales won the fight unanimous decision.

Morales defended her ISKA title against Oumaiima Arhou. She won the fight by unanimous decision.

Morales was scheduled to fight for the vacant Enfusion 52 kg belt against the 57 kg champion Georgina van der Linden, during Enfusion 89. Morales won a split decision, which was considered an upset at the time.

Morales participated in the 2019 K-1 Flyweight Championship Tournament, facing Kana Morimoto in the semi finals. Morales lost to the eventual tournament winner by unanimous decision.

Morales is scheduled to defend her ISKA Atomweight title against Simona Di Dio Martello during MFC Showdown 008. Morales won by a unanimous decision.

She was the Kickboxingz.com Female Fighter of the Year for 2019.

Morales was scheduled to face Anissa Meksen at ONE Championship: Empower on September 3, 2021. She lost the fight by a second-round knockout.

Championships and accomplishments

Titles
Enfusion
Enfusion 52 kg World Championship
International Sport Karate Association
ISKA Atomweight K1 World Championship
Two successful title defenses
International Professional Combat Council
 2021 IPCC Intercontinental -52kg Championship

Awards
2019 KickboxingZ.com "Female Fighter of the Year"
2019 Sports Institute of Seville "Best Female Athlete"

Fight record

|-  bgcolor="#FFBBBB"
| 2021-09-03 || Loss ||align=left| Anissa Meksen || ONE Championship: Empower || Kallang, Singapore || KO (Left hook) || 2 || 2:27

|-  bgcolor="#cfc"
| 2021-06-19 || Win ||align=left| Jleana Valentino ||  || Marbella, Spain || Decision (Unanimous) || 5 || 3:00
|-
! style=background:white colspan=9 |

|-  bgcolor="#CCFFCC"
| 2020-08-01 || Win||align=left| Simona Di Dio Martello || MFC Showdown 008 || Seville, Spain || Decision (Unanimous) || 5 || 3:00
|-
! style=background:white colspan=9 |
|-
|-  bgcolor="#FFBBBB"
| 2019-12-28|| Loss||align=left| Kana Morimoto || K-1 World GP 2019 Japan: ～Women's Flyweight Championship Tournament～ || Nagoya, Japan || Decision (Unanimous) || 3 || 3:00
|-
! style=background:white colspan=9 |
|-
|-  bgcolor="#CCFFCC"
| 2019-10-26|| Win||align=left| Georgina Van Der Linden || Enfusion 89 || Wuppertal, Germany || Decision (Split) || 5 || 3:00
|-
! style=background:white colspan=9 |
|-
|-  bgcolor="#CCFFCC"
| 2019-09-25|| Win||align=left| Oumaiima Ahrou || Kryssing World Series || Seville, Spain || Decision (Unanimous) || 5 || 3:00
|-
! style=background:white colspan=9 |
|-
|-  bgcolor="#CCFFCC"
| 2019-06-07|| Win||align=left| Emilie Machut || Enfusion: Ece 1 || Tenerife, Spain || Decision (Unanimous) || 3 || 3:00
|-
|-  bgcolor="#FFBBBB"
| 2019-05-18|| Loss||align=left| Silvia La Notte || Master Fight || Chalon-sur-Saône, France || Decision (Unanimous) || 3 || 3:00
|-
|-  bgcolor="#CCFFCC"
| 2019-03-30|| Win||align=left| Fanny Ramos || Ultimate Fight Night 11 || Paris, France || KO (High Kick) || 3 ||
|-
! style=background:white colspan=9 |

|-  bgcolor="#CCFFCC"
| 2018-10-27|| Win||align=left| Rita Marrero || SLAM Arena 2018 || Las Palmas de Gran Canaria, Spain || Decision || 3 || 3:00

|-  style="background:#fbb;"
| 2016-10-15|| Loss||align=left| Wang Xue || Rise of Heroes 2|| Zhangshu, China || Decision (Unanimous) ||3 || 3:00

|-  bgcolor="#CCFFCC"
| 2013-05-04|| Win||align=left| Maria Garcia Espejo || ? || Málaga, Spain || Decision (Unanimous) || 3 || 3:00
|-
|-  bgcolor="#CCFFCC"
| 2012-11-17|| Win||align=left| Michele Clayton || Heroes IV || Cordoba, Spain || Decision (Unanimous) || 3 || 3:00
|-
|-  bgcolor="#CCFFCC"
| 2012-11-03|| Win||align=left| Samira Hamham || Muay Thai event Bari Gym || Noordwijkerhout, Netherlands || Decision (Unanimous) || 3 || 3:00
|-
|-  bgcolor="#CCFFCC"
| 2012-06-16|| Win||align=left| Sylvie Hausseray || Clichy-sous-Bois Boxing Club || Clichy-sous-Bois, France || Decision (Unanimous) || 3 || 3:00
|-
|-
| colspan=9 | Legend:

See also
 List of female kickboxers
 List of female ISKA champions

References 

Spanish kickboxers
1993 births
Living people
People from Seville
Sportspeople from Seville
ONE Championship kickboxers